MechWarrior, known in Japan as , is a first-person action video game for the Super NES set in the BattleTech universe. The SNES game was based upon the original PC MechWarrior, with updated graphics that utilized Mode 7 for the Battlemech mission sequences instead of the PC version's flat-shaded 3D graphics.

The game was followed by a sequel, MechWarrior 3050, which is played from an isometric view.

Story
The main character is a MechWarrior named Herras whose family was killed by a group of military rogues called "The Dark Wing Lance". Playing as Herras, the player battles many enemies, trying to seek out the leader of the rogues while relying on intel from a host of contacts and allies at a bar on a nearby planet in the system. In the end, the player's objective is to hunt down and kill the members of the Dark Wing Lance and avenge the deaths of Herras' family.

Gameplay

Mechs
Mechwarrior on SNES is unusual for several reasons; one is that the game featured a unique stable of BattleMechs that were developed specifically for the game. Many share similarities or are clear variations of BattleMechs from other games, but others are completely unique.

Reception

Super Gamer gave the SNES version a review score of 88%, stating: "The official BattleTech game has you fighting hordes of giant robots in an atmospheric, Mode 7 first person perspective." Power Unlimited gave the game a score of 85% writing: "Mechwarrior is based around a rather unique formula. It is a pity that gathering information at the beginning of the game is boring and tedious. However, the action that follows later is excellent."

References

External links

1993 video games
Activision games
BattleTech games
Video games about mecha
MechWarrior
Super Nintendo Entertainment System games
Super Nintendo Entertainment System-only games
Video games developed in Australia
Video games set on fictional planets